Love Exercise is a cover album of Taiwanese singer Jolin Tsai. It was released on October 31, 2008, by Gold Typhoon and Mars. It contains covers of 10 English classic songs, and it released alongside her book publication under the same title. Tsai collaborated with various producers on the album, including Paula Ma, Peter Lee, Jim Lee, Daniel Bi, Paul Lee, and Adia.

It was scheduled to be released on March 7, 2008, but it was forced to be postponed due to the personnel change and withdrawal from the entire Asian market of EMI in the same year. It received negative reviews from music critics, who criticized its lack of creativity in production and the original songs are way too classic. It sold more than 30,000 copies in Taiwan without any actual promotion, and it became the year's highest-selling Western-language album in the country.

Background and development 
On September 21, 2007, Tsai released her ninth studio album Agent J, and it released alongside the film under the same title. It sold more than 3 million copies in Asia. In Taiwan, it sold more than 200,000 copies, becoming the highest-selling album of the year. On January 12, 2008, it was reported that Tsai has begun working on her English album, which would be released around Chinese New Year of the year, and it would complement her book publication under the same title. Before then, Tsai released two English books Jolin's English Diary Book (2005) and Jolin's Party (2006), and they sold more than 120,000 copies and 150,000 copies in Taiwan, respectively.

On January 20, 2008, EMI announced that the album would be available for pre-order on February 14, 2008 and would be released on March 7, 2008. Tsai said that it is fast and effective to learn English through listening to English songs, she added: "So far, I still like to learn English through listening to English songs." The album includes ten English songs related to love, it complements the book under the same title, and the lyrics of the songs are used as starting point to explain the vocabularies and grammars.

On February 29, 2008, it was forced to be delayed due to the personnel change in EMI Greater China, Tsai's manager Howard Chiang said that the budget of the album is more than NT$5 million, and he asked EMI to decide on the release date as soon as possible. On March 26, 2008, it was reported that the withdrawal from the entire Asian market of EMI would be occurred after Easter of the year. On July 4, 2008, Howard Chiang said that Tsai could not cooperate the promotion for the album anymore, since there would be scheduling conflict with other projects. On August 3, 2008, Norman Cheng, the former president of EMI Asia, announced that he would acquire all the shares in EMI Greater China, including EMI of Taiwan, Gold Label of Hong Kong, and Push Typhoon of China, and he would found a new company named Gold Typhoon. On August 27, 2008, Tsai said that the album would be released in September or October 2008.

Release and promotion 

On October 14, 2008, Gold Typhoon announced that the album would be available for pre-order on October 17, 2008 and would be released on October 31, 2008. On October 20, 2008, the lead song "I Won't Last a Day Without You" was released. On October 30, 2008, Gold Typhoon released the music video of "I Won't Last a Day Without You", which was directed by Marlboro Lai. On November 23, 2008, the music video of "When You Say Nothing at All" was released, and it was directed by Hooya Chen. On November 28, 2008, Gold Typhoon released the LOHAS edition of the album. In December 2008, the music video of "Lady Marmalade" was released, and it was directed by HooYa Production.

The album debuted at number one on the weekly Western-language album sales charts of Five Music and G-Music in Taiwan. As of December 31, 2008, the album has sold more than 30,000 copies in Taiwan without any actual promotion, it reached number 10 and number two on the 2008 Western-language album sales charts of Five Music and G-Music, and it became the year's highest-selling Western-language album in the country. "I Won't Last a Day Without You" reached number seven on the 2008 Hit FM Top 100 Singles of the Year chart.

Critical reception 
Writing for NetEase, Lin Juli described: "The production is very similar to the original version, the music arraignment is traditional, basically there is nothing special from the original version." NetEase's Cabin wrote: "Although the album was forced to be released due to the approval procedure, leading to low sales. The cover album includes ten English love songs about Tsai's love feelings, and it's the album's so-called 'concept'. All the 10 love songs are their original performers' hits, on the other hand, Tsai added more of her perception and understanding when recording those songs, with the successful music arraignment, Tsai sang in her own style." Tencent Entertainment's Shuwa said: "The production is not fine enough, and the songs she covered are way too classic, leading to a lot of negative reception."

Track listing

Release history

References

External links 
 

2008 albums
Covers albums
Gold Typhoon Taiwan albums
Jolin Tsai albums